Panning is the distribution of an audio signal (either monaural or stereophonic pairs) into a new stereo or multi-channel sound field determined by a pan control setting. A typical physical recording console has a pan control for each incoming source channel. A pan control or pan pot (short for "panning potentiometer") is an analog control with a position indicator which can range continuously from the 7 o'clock when fully left to the 5 o'clock position fully right. Audio mixing software replaces pan pots with on-screen virtual knobs or sliders which function like their physical counterparts.

Overview
A pan pot has an internal architecture which determines how much of a source signal is sent to the left and right buses. "Pan pots split audio signals into left and right channels, each equipped with its own discrete gain (volume) control." This signal distribution is often called a taper or law.

When centered (at 12 o'clock), the law can be designed to send −3, −4.5 or −6 decibels (dB) equally to each bus. "Signal passes through both the channels at an equal volume while the pan pot points directly north." If the two output buses are later recombined into a monaural signal, then a pan law of -6 dB is desirable. If the two output buses are to remain stereo then a law of -3 dB is desirable. A law of −4.5 dB at center is a compromise between the two. A pan control fully rotated to one side results in the source being sent at full strength (0 dB) to one bus (either the left or right channel) and zero strength (− dB) to the other. Regardless of the pan setting, the overall sound power level remains (or appears to remain) constant.  Because of the phantom center phenomenon, sound panned to the center position is perceived as coming from between the left and right speakers, but not in the center unless listened to with headphones, because of head-related transfer function HRTF. 

Panning in audio borrows its name from panning action in moving image technology. An audio pan pot can be used in a mix to create the impression that a source is moving from one side of the soundstage to the other, although ideally there would be timing (including phase and Doppler effects), filtering and reverberation differences present for a more complete picture of apparent movement within a defined space. Simple analog pan controls only change relative level; they don't add reverb to replace direct signal, phase changes, modify the spectrum, or change delay timing. "Tracks thus seem to move in the direction that [one] point[s] the pan pots on a mixer, even though [one] actually attenuate[s] those tracks on the opposite side of the horizontal plane."

Panning can also be used in an audio mixer to reduce or reverse the stereo width of a stereo signal. For instance, the left and right channels of a stereo source can be panned straight up, that is sent equally to both the left output and the right output of the mixer, creating a dual mono signal. 

An early panning process was used in the development of Fantasound, an early pioneering stereophonic sound reproduction system for Fantasia (1940).

Stereo-switching
Before pan pots were available, "a three-way switch was used to assign the track to the left output, right output, or both (the center)". Ubiquitous in the Billboard charts throughout the middle and late 1960s, clear examples include the Beatles's "Strawberry Fields Forever" and Jimi Hendrix's "Purple Haze", Stevie Wonder's "Living for the City". In the Beatles's "A Day In The Life" Lennon's vocals are switched to the extreme right on the first two strophes, on the third strophe they are switched center then extreme left, and switched left on the final strophe while during the bridge McCartney's vocals are switched extreme right.

See also
Pan law
BalanceReferences

Further reading
 Rumsey, Francis and McCormick, Tim (2002). Sound and Recording: An Introduction''. Focal Press. 

Stereophonic sound
Audio mixing

ja:パン (撮影技法)